Dalton Smith (born 30 June 1992) is a Canadian professional ice hockey player who is currently playing with the Colorado Eagles in the American Hockey League (AHL). Smith was selected by the Columbus Blue Jackets in the 2nd round (34th overall) of the 2010 NHL Entry Draft.

Playing career
Smith played four seasons (2008–2012) of major junior hockey with the Ottawa 67's of the Ontario Hockey League (OHL), scoring 50 goals and 55 assists for 105 points, and earning 328 penalty minutes, over 196 games.

On 8 August 2011, the Columbus Blue Jackets signed Smith to a three-year entry level contract.

At the 2013–14 trade deadline, the Blue Jackets traded Smith and Jonathan Marchessault, to the Tampa Bay Lightning in exchange for Dana Tyrell and Matt Taormina on 5 March 2014,.

Smith spent the 2014–15 season with the Lightning's AHL affiliate, the Syracuse Crunch. When Smith's contract was not renewed, he accepted a try-out contract with the Providence Bruins of the AHL on 3 October 2015.

Failing to catch on in Providence, Smith was signed to a one-year contract with the Lehigh Valley Phantoms. He played 11 games with the Phantoms. After not being resigned by the Phantoms Smith attended the training camp of the Charlotte Checkers of the AHL. Smith belatedly signed a one-year contract with Charlotte near the start of the 2016–17 season, moving down one tier to their ECHL affiliate, the Florida Everblades, on 9 October 2016.

After playing out the season with the Everblades, recording a professional high 23 points in 60 games, Smith as a free agent the following summer attended the Rochester Americans 2017 training camp on 25 September 2017.

During the 2019–20 season, his 8th professional year, on December 30, 2019, Smith signed a one-year, two-way contract with the Americans' parent NHL club, the Buffalo Sabres. He was recalled to make his long-awaited NHL debut with the Sabres against the Tampa Bay Lightning on December 31, 2019, registering 2 penalty minutes in 1:26 of ice-time in a 6–4 defeat. He was placed on waivers to return to Rochester on 2 January 2020.

At the conclusion of his contract, Smith was not extended by the Sabres and as a free agent opted to remain within the organization, continuing his tenure in the AHL with the Americans on a one-year deal on 12 October 2020.

On 29 July 2021, Smith left Rochester after four seasons and signed to add a veteran presence on a one-year contract with the Colorado Eagles of the AHL. Smith enjoyed his most productive season in the AHL since 2015 during the 2021–22 season, collecting 5 goals and 11 points in 52 regular season games.

On 28 June 2022, Smith agreed to a two-year contract extension to remain with the Eagles.

Career statistics

References

External links

1992 births
Living people
Buffalo Sabres players
Canadian ice hockey left wingers
Colorado Eagles players
Columbus Blue Jackets draft picks
Florida Everblades players
Ice hockey people from Ontario
Lehigh Valley Phantoms players
Ontario Junior Hockey League players
Ottawa 67's players
Providence Bruins players
Rochester Americans players
Sportspeople from Oshawa
Springfield Falcons players
Syracuse Crunch players